Jimbilnan Wilderness is an 18,879 acre (7,640 ha) wilderness area that starts from the northeast side of the Black Mountains and extends eastward towards Lake Mead. On its west side lies Pinto Valley Wilderness Park, and Las Vegas can be found 40 miles (64 km) west from the area. Jimbilnan Wilderness was designated as a wilderness area in 2002 and is under the management of the National Park Service.

Geography
The terrain of the Jimbilnan Wilderness is quite diverse, from canyons that sprawl from the Black Mountains range to three washes that plateaued towards Lake Mead. The area is also well-known for several rare floras, the Beaver Dam milkvetch and the sticky buckwheat. A variety of bird species make their home in this wilderness area, including the red-tailed hawk, the white-crowned sparrow, and bald eagles.

See also 

 List of wilderness areas in the United States

References

Wilderness areas of Nevada